The 2016 FIM CEV Moto3 Junior World Championship was the fifth CEV Moto3 season and the third under the FIM banner. The season was held over 12 races at 8 meetings, beginning on 17 April at Valencia and finishing on 20 November at the same venue.

Calendar

Entry list

Championship standings

Scoring system
Points are awarded to the top fifteen finishers. A rider has to finish the race to earn points.

Riders' championship

Constructors' championship

External links

2016
2016 in motorcycle sport